Sophie Balmary (born 28 May 1979) is a French rower. She competed at the 2000 Summer Olympics, 2004 Summer Olympics and the 2008 Summer Olympics.

References

External links
 

1979 births
Living people
French female rowers
Olympic rowers of France
Rowers at the 2000 Summer Olympics
Rowers at the 2004 Summer Olympics
Rowers at the 2008 Summer Olympics
People from Cahors
Sportspeople from Lot (department)
20th-century French women
21st-century French women